Alan Ashworth, FRS (born 1960 in Bolton, Lancashire) is a British molecular biologist, noted for his work on genes involved in cancer susceptibility. He is currently the President of the UCSF Helen Diller Family Comprehensive Cancer Center at the University of California, San Francisco, a multidisciplinary research and clinical care organisation that is one of the largest cancer centres in the Western United States. He was previously CEO of the Institute of Cancer Research (ICR) in London.

Early life
Ashworth was educated at St Mary's Primary School and Thornleigh Salesian College, Bolton. He completed his Bachelor of Science in Chemistry and Biochemistry at Imperial College, London, and was awarded a PhD in Biochemistry at University College, London.

Career
Ashworth joined the Institute for Cancer Research (ICR) in London in 1986 as a Postdoctoral research Scientist in the Section of Cell and Molecular Biology and in 1999 he was appointed the first Director of the Breakthrough Breast Cancer Research Centre (BBCRC). The Centre is now recognised internationally and has more than 120 scientists and researchers working on aspects of the disease ranging from basic molecular and cellular biology through to translational research and clinical trials. Ashworth's Directorship ended in January 2011 when he took up the position of Chief Executive of the ICR which he held until December 2014.

One of Ashworth's major contributions to cancer research has been his work on genes involved in cancer risk. He was a key part of the team that in 1995 discovered the BRCA2 gene, which is linked to an increased risk of some types of cancers/ which is now used to identify women at high risk of the disease. Ten years later, Ashworth identified a way to exploit genetic weaknesses in cancer cells including mutated BRCA 1 or BRCA2, leading to a new approach to work on Poly ADP ribose polymerase (PARP) as a drug target for cancer.

Ashworth's research and leadership reflects his passion for translating laboratory studies into improvements in patient care, particularly by the development of personalised cancer medicine.

In 2014, Ashworth stepped down as Director of the ICR to join the University of California, San Francisco as President of the UCSF Helen Diller Family Comprehensive Cancer Center (HDFCCC) and Senior Vice-President of Cancer Services of UCSF Health from January 2015. He also serves as Professor of Medicine, Division of Hematology/Oncology, Department of Medicine and holds the 
E. Dixon Heise Distinguished Professorship in Oncology.

In 2016, Ashworth and Pamela Munster, MD, established the UCSF Center for BRCA Research. In November 2016 he started the San Francisco Cancer Initiative (SF CAN).  In 2017, he became inaugural chair of the University of California Cancer Consortium.

Awards and recognition
1991	British Postgraduate Medical Federation Prize
1999	Elected to European Molecular Biology Organization.
2002 	Elected Fellow of the Academy of Medical Sciences	
2008 Fellow of the Royal Society.
2009	European Society for Medical Oncology Lifetime Achievement Award
2009 	Elected Fellow of the European Academy of Cancer Sciences
2010 	Samuel Waxman Cancer Research Foundation David Workman Memorial Award
2010	Meyenburg Foundation Cancer Research Award
2013 Basser Global Prize
2015 Spirit of Empowerment Award, Facing Our Risk of Cancer Empowered (FORCE)
2015 Genetics Society Medal
2016 Drexel Prize in Cancer Biology
2016 American Association for Cancer Research Board of Directors
2017 Komen Brinker Award for Scientific Distinction

References

External links
 Q&A with the New Director of the UCSF Helen Diller Family Comprehensive Cancer Center
 President's Welcome
 Alan Ashworth's Blog

1960 births
Living people
Fellows of the Royal Society
People from Bolton
British medical researchers
Academics of the Institute of Cancer Research
British molecular biologists
Alumni of Imperial College London
Alumni of University College London
University of California, San Francisco faculty